Daniel Gordon "Neil" Rioch (born 13 April 1951) is an English former professional footballer who played as a defender in the Football League for Aston Villa, York City, Northampton Town and Plymouth Argyle, in the North American Soccer League for Toronto Metros and Portland Timbers. The younger brother of Scotland captain Bruce Rioch he was one of the ball boys at the 1966 World Cup final and claims to be the first Englishman to touch the ball at that event. He was also on the books of Luton Town without making a league appearance. He was capped by the England national youth team in 1969.

References

1951 births
Living people
Footballers from Paddington
English footballers
England youth international footballers
Association football defenders
Luton Town F.C. players
Aston Villa F.C. players
Toronto Blizzard (1971–1984) players
York City F.C. players
Northampton Town F.C. players
Plymouth Argyle F.C. players
Portland Timbers (1975–1982) players
English Football League players
North American Soccer League (1968–1984) players
English people of Scottish descent
English expatriate sportspeople in the United States
Expatriate soccer players in the United States
English expatriate footballers
English expatriate sportspeople in Canada
Expatriate soccer players in Canada